Chris Humphrey (born 27 March 1972) is a Barbadian cricketer. He played in one List A match for the Barbados cricket team in 1999/00.

See also
 List of Barbadian representative cricketers

References

External links
 

1972 births
Living people
Barbadian cricketers
Barbados cricketers
People from Christ Church, Barbados